Woodward William "Red" Gunkel (April 15, 1894 – April 19, 1954) was a Major League Baseball pitcher who appeared in one game for the Cleveland Indians during the 1916 season. He attended the University of Illinois at Urbana–Champaign.

External links

1894 births
1954 deaths
People from Bureau County, Illinois
Major League Baseball pitchers
Cleveland Indians players
Baseball players from Illinois
Davenport Blue Sox players